XHEZM-FM is a radio station on 103.9 FM in Zamora, Michoacán. It is owned by Grupo Radio Zamora and is known as La Zamorana with a Spanish oldies format.

History
XEZM-AM 650 received its concession on June 30, 1948. It broadcast with 5 kW day and added nighttime broadcasts at 1 kW in the 1990s. It migrated to FM in 2011.

References

Radio stations in Michoacán